Robert Aitken FRSE PRSSA PBAD (1888–1954) was an early 20th-century Scottish physician specialising in dermatology and was an expert on lupus vulgaris. He served as president of the Royal Scottish Society of Arts from 1941 to 1944. He was president of the British Association of Dermatologists from 1949 to 1950.

Life
Aitken was born on 6 April 1888 in Edinburgh and was educated at Daniel Stewart's College.

He studied medicine at Edinburgh University, graduating MB ChB in 1911, and then when to work as an assistant to a Dr Crerar in Maryport and then returned to Edinburgh to study dermatology under Norman Walker.

In the First World War he served as a physician to the Royal Navy on a hospital ship with the Mediterranean Fleet. During this period he received his doctorate (MD) in 1917. After the war he began working as a dermatologist at Edinburgh Royal Infirmary, where he remained for his entire career. From 1933 he began lecturing in dermatology at Edinburgh University. In 1945 he was elected a Fellow of the Royal Society of Edinburgh. His proposers were Douglas Guthrie, Ernest Wedderburn, William Frederick Harvey and Andrew W. Young.

He retired in July 1953 and died in Edinburgh Royal Infirmary of heart disease on 17 March 1954 following a period of ill-health.

Publications
Ultra Violet Radiations and Their Uses
The Problem of Lupus Vulgaris

References 

1888 births
1954 deaths
20th-century Scottish medical doctors
Fellows of the Royal Society of Edinburgh
Medical doctors from Edinburgh
People educated at Stewart's Melville College
Scottish dermatologists
Alumni of the University of Edinburgh Medical School